Michael Straus (16 May 1924 – 11 May 1977) was a British fencer. He competed in the team sabre event at the 1960 Summer Olympics.

References

External links
 

1924 births
1977 deaths
British male fencers
Olympic fencers of Great Britain
Fencers at the 1960 Summer Olympics
Fencers from Berlin